Fustius parasensora is a moth of the family Erebidae first described by Michael Fibiger in 2010. It is known from southern Laos.

Description
The wingspan is about 10mm.

The head, patagia, thorax, and ground colour of the forewing, including the fringes is brown, but the basal part of the costa and the costal part of the medial area are blackish brown. The crosslines are indistinct or untraceable, while the terminal line is marked by black inter-neural dots.

The hindwing is grey and the underside of the forewing is brown grey and the underside of the hindwing is grey.

References

Micronoctuini
Taxa named by Michael Fibiger
Moths of Asia
Moths described in 2010